Assylbek is a Kazakh musician known for his virtuosity on the traditional national two string instrument dombyra. He is the first to marry the traditional Kazakh melodies to modern electronic music.

He was born in 1980 in Aktobe. His father Zhasaral, a composer, was the director of a music school; his mother Farida stayed at home. He has two brothers: Aybek (designer) and Syrym (singer). Following a typical parcours in classical musical education, he graduated from A. Zhubanova musical school and Kurmagazy national conservatory in Almaty in Kazakhstan.

Discography:

– Adai (2010)

1. Адай – Кұрманғазы

2. Әке толғауы – Ж.Еңсепов

3. Кең жайлау – Б. Қошмухамбетов

4. Жұмыр қылыш – Махамбет

5. Концерт 1–4 – Будашкин

6. Науаи – Дина

7. Арнау-Аллаға шүкіршілік – исп. А.Еңсепов, Р.Гайсин, С.Жолбарыс, Б.Кушкалиев

8. Хафиз – С.Жолбарыс

9. Бесконечность – Р.Гайсин

10. Нұр шашу – Ж.Еңсепов

11. Таң Нұры – С.Жолбарыс

12. Детство – Т.Мухамеджанов

13. Құралай – С.Жолбарыс

References

http://ololo.fm/artist/biography/%D0%90%D1%81%D1%8B%D0%BB%D0%B1%D0%B5%D0%BA+%D0%95%D0%BD%D1%81%D0%B5%D0%BF%D0%BE%D0%B2

Kazakhstani musicians